Ultraphobic is the fourth studio album by American rock band Warrant. Released on March 7, 1995, on CMC International, after the apparent breakup of the band, the record was regarded as the band's "comeback" album. It is the first album to feature former Kingdom Come and Wild Horses members Rick Steier and James Kottak who came in to replace original band members Joey Allen and Steven Sweet.

Production and marketing 
Warrant began recording Ultraphobic in November 1994 with producer Beau Hill. The band supported the release of the record with a national tour beginning in Dallas, Texas.

A music video was made for the first single "Family Picnic" with a strong message against family violence and for the second single "Stronger Now", which ended up becoming Lane's best song because it was therapeutic to him.

"Followed" was released as the third single of the album.

Musical style 
Ultraphobic saw Warrant acknowledging the grunge phenomenon with a record that openly admitted to a Seattle influence, although it was still a natural progression from the hard edged Dog Eat Dog. It is vaguely similar to Danger Danger's Dawn, which was also released in 1995. In particular, the record represented an experimentation with the grunge sounds which had by this time become popular, and which, ironically, had contributed to the band's commercial demise. In songs such as "Undertow" and "Followed", the band attempted to mix pop metal sounds with the alternative stylings of Seattle bands such as Alice in Chains and Soundgarden.

Lyrics 
Many of the lyrics on Ultraphobic were inspired by Jani Lane's divorce from Bobbie Brown, the video model who appeared in the "Cherry Pie" music video.

Track listing

Personnel 
Jani Lane – lead vocals
Erik Turner – rhythm guitar
Jerry Dixon – bass guitar
Rick Steier – lead guitar
James Kottak – drums

Additional personnel
 Dave White – keyboards

Production
Beau Hill – mixing
Mixed at Enterprise Studios, Burbank, California
Mastered at Sterling Sound, New York City

References

External links 
 Warrant Official Site
 Classic Warrant Videos on Sony BMG MusicBox

Warrant (American band) albums
1995 albums
Albums produced by Beau Hill
CMC International albums